Carievale is a village in the Canadian province of Saskatchewan within the Rural Municipality of Argyle No. 1 and Census Division No. 1. The village lies at the intersection of Highway 8 and Highway 18.

History 
The community's post office was established on February 1, 1891. Carievale incorporated as a village on March 14, 1903.

Demographics 

See also 

 List of communities in Saskatchewan
 List of villages in Saskatchewan

References

Villages in Saskatchewan
Argyle No. 1, Saskatchewan
Division No. 1, Saskatchewan